Pedro Benito Antonio Quevedo y Quintano (Villanueva del Fresno, 1736 - Ourense, 1818) was a Spanish Roman Catholic clergyman and politician.

Named a bishop in 1776, he founded the Seminary of Ourense in 1803, and was one of the five people chosen for the Council of Regency that operated as the executive body of Spain's Supreme Central Junta after Ferdinand VII was deposed during the Peninsular War. He was also, at the time, the last Grand Inquisitor, until the Spanish Inquisition was abolished by the Cortes of Cádizwhich the Supreme Central Junta had established in 1910 to act as a parliamentary Regency. In 1816 Pope Pius VII named him a cardinal.

His sepulchre in the Ourense Cathedral was designed by sculptor Antoni Solà.

External links
 Portrait of Pedro de Quevedo y Quintano and brief biography, included in the book Retratos de Españoles ilustres, published in 1791.
Obispado de Orense. Creación del Seminario Mayor Divino Maestro.

1736 births
1818 deaths
Bishops of Ourense
19th-century Spanish cardinals
Politicians from Extremadura
University of Salamanca alumni
Cardinals created by Pope Pius VII